Principal may refer to:

Title or rank
 Principal (academia), the chief executive of a university 
 Principal (education), the office holder or boss in any school

 Principal (civil service) or principal officer, the senior management level in the UK Civil Service 
 Principal dancer, the top rank in ballet
 Principal (music), the top rank in an orchestra

Law
 Principal (commercial law), the person who authorizes an agent
 Principal (architecture), licensed professional(s) with ownership of the firm
 Principal (criminal law), the primary actor in a criminal offense
 Principal (Catholic Church), an honorific used in the See of Lisbon

Places
 Principal, Cape Verde, a village
 Principal, Ecuador, a parish

Media
 The Principal (TV series), a 2015 Australian drama series
 The Principal, a 1987 action film
 Principal (music), the lead musician in a section of an orchestra
 Principal photography, the first phase of movie production
 "The Principal", a song on the album K-12 by Melanie Martinez

Finance
 Principal (finance) or principal sum, the original amount of a debt or investment on which interest is calculated
 Principal (bond), the face value of a bond
 Principal Financial Group, a life insurance company

Other uses
 Principal (computer security), an entity that can be identified and verified
 Principal or diapason, one of the flue pipes on a pipe organ
 Principal or diapason, a corresponding organ stop on a pipe organ
 Victoria Principal (born 1950), American actress

See also
 Principle (disambiguation), easily confused word